Tylogonus is a genus of jumping spiders that was first described by Eugène Louis Simon in 1902. It is considered a senior synonym of Phintodes.

Species
 it contains eleven species, found in Brazil, Colombia, Venezuela, Ecuador, and Panama:
Tylogonus auricapillus Simon, 1902 (type) – Ecuador
Tylogonus chiriqui Galiano, 1994 – Panama
Tylogonus miles Simon, 1903 – Venezuela
Tylogonus parabolicus Galiano, 1985 – Colombia
Tylogonus parvus Zhang & Maddison, 2012 – Ecuador
Tylogonus pichincha Galiano, 1985 – Ecuador
Tylogonus prasinus Simon, 1902 – Brazil
Tylogonus putumayo Galiano, 1985 – Colombia
Tylogonus vachoni Galiano, 1960 – Brazil
Tylogonus viridimicans (Simon, 1901) – Ecuador
Tylogonus yanayacu Zhang & Maddison, 2012 – Ecuador

References

Salticidae genera
Salticidae
Spiders of South America